Johann Müller may refer to:

 Regiomontanus (1436–1476), German mathematician, astronomer, astrologer, translator, instrument maker and Catholic bishop
 Johann Müller (composer) (fl. 1640–), German composer and organist
 Johann Friedrich Theodor Müller (1821–1897), German biologist and physician who emigrated to southern Brazil
 Johann Gotthard von Müller (1747–1830), German line engraver
 Johann Heinrich Jakob Müller (1809–1875), German physicist
 Johann Helfrich von Müller (1746–1830), German engineer; inventor of the difference engine
 Johann Jakob Müller (1846–1875), Swiss physiologist and physicist
 Johann Jakob Müller (philosopher) (1650–1716), German moral philosopher
 Johann Wilhelm von Müller (1824–1866), German ornithologist and explorer
 Johann Müller Argoviensis (1828–1896), Swiss botanist
 Johann Müller (footballer)

See also 
 Johann Muller (rugby union) (born 1980), South African Rugby Union player
 Johannes Müller (disambiguation)
 Hans Müller (disambiguation)
 Johanna Müller-Hermann (1878–1941), Austrian composer